Serghei Cleșcenco (born 20 May 1972) is a Moldovan football coach and a former player. He is the manager of the Moldova national team.

He holds the record for the most goals scored in a single season by a foreigner in Israel. He is a former manager of Zimbru Chișinău, where he also spent large parts of his playing career. He is the all-time top goalscorer of the Moldova national team with 11 goals.

Career
After a successful period with Zimbru Chișinău, Cleșcenco was taken on trial by English club Watford in early 1998. He impressed, but work permit issues, along with Zimbru Chișinău asking for too much money prevented the deal from going through.

In 1999, Cleșcenco joined Maccabi Haifa. It was one of the most successful starts ever for a foreigner in Israel as he bagged 22 goals in his first season topping the record set by Polish striker Andrzej Kubica for most goals scored by a foreigner in Israel in a single season. After another strong season in Haifa, he moved to Hapoel Tel Aviv, where he was part of the squad that reached the quarter-finals of the UEFA Cup. He scored one of the goals as they memorably knocked out Chelsea.

Personal life
Cleșcenco's son, Nicky Cleșcenco, is also a footballer who has appeared for the Moldova national team.

International goals
Scores and results list Moldova's goal tally first.

Honours

Player
Zimbru Chișinău
Moldovan National Division: 1992, 1992–93, 1993–94, 1994–95, 1995–96, 1997–98

Maccabi Haifa
Israeli Premier League: 2000–01

Hapoel Tel Aviv
Toto Cup: 2001–02

Manager
Milsami
Moldovan Cup: 2011–12
Moldovan Super Cup: 2012

Managerial Statistics

References

External links
 Profile and biography of Sergei Cleșcenco on Maccabi Haifa's official website 
 
 Serghei Cleșcenco at Championat.ru

1972 births
Living people
People from Criuleni District
Moldovan footballers
Moldovan expatriate footballers
Moldova international footballers
FC Oryol players
FC Zimbru Chișinău players
Go Ahead Eagles players
FC Zenit Saint Petersburg players
Maccabi Haifa F.C. players
Hapoel Tel Aviv F.C. players
FC Chernomorets Novorossiysk players
Bnei Yehuda Tel Aviv F.C. players
FC Sibir Novosibirsk players
FC Novokuznetsk players
Moldovan Super Liga players
Russian Premier League players
Moldovan football managers
FC Zimbru Chișinău managers
FC Milsami Orhei managers
Association football forwards
Expatriate footballers in Israel
Expatriate footballers in Russia
Moldovan expatriate sportspeople in Israel
Moldovan expatriate sportspeople in Russia
Moldovan Super Liga managers
Moldova national football team managers